Bruce Q. Chandler (born May 7, 1952) is an American businessman and politician from Washington. Chandler is a Republican member of the Washington House of Representatives, representing District 15, Position 1 since 1999.

Career 
In 1985, Chandler became the owner and operator of Chandler Ranches Limited Liability Company, a commercial fruit orchard.

On November 3, 1998, Chandler won the election and became a Republican member of Washington House of Representatives for District 15, Position 1. Chandler defeated Walter J. Braten with 62.04% of the votes.

On November 3, 2020, as an incumbent, Chandler won the election, and continued serving as a member of Washington House of Representatives for District 15, Position 1. Chandler defeated Jack McEntire with 58.02% of the votes. Chandler's current term ends on January 9, 2023.

Awards 
 2008 Key Award. Presented by Washington Coalition for Open Government.
 2010 Legislator of the Decade. Presented by NFIB.
 2011 Cornerstone Award. Presented by the Association of Washington Business.
 2012 Guardian of Small Business award. Presented by NFIB.
 2012 W. Fred Witham Memorial Award. Presented by Yakima Association of Realtors.
 2014 Guardians of Small Business award. Presented by NFIB.
 2016 Crayon Award. Presented by Early Learning Action Alliance.
 2020 Guardians of Small Business. Presented by NFIB.

Personal life 
Chandler's wife is Julie Chandler. They have three children. Chandler and his family lived in Zillah, Washington and now live in Granger, Washington.

References

External links 
 Bruce Chandler at ballotpedia.org
 Bruce Chandler at ourcampaigns.com
 Bruce Chandler at houserepublicans.wa.gov
 Bruce Chandler at hroc.us

1952 births
21st-century American politicians
Living people
Republican Party members of the Washington House of Representatives
People from Yakima County, Washington